Herminia Naglerowa (sometimes wrote under the penname Jan Stycz, born 28 October 1890 in Zaliski near Brody, died 9 October 1957 in London) was a Polish writer and publicist.

Naglerowa studied history at the University of Lwów where she got her PhD. Subsequently she worked as a teacher, at first (1919) in Warsaw. Her first poems were published in the Viennese Kurier Polski in 1915. She also became known for her prose works, Czarny pies (1924, "The Black Dog") and Matowa Kres (1929) in which she combined realism with expressionism. She wrote the trilogy Krauzowie i inni (1930) ("The Family Krauz and others") which depicted the saga of a Galician family in the aftermath of the January Uprising. She also wrote youth literature; Ludzie prawdziwi ("Real People", 1935).

After the attack of Nazi Germany on Poland she moved back to Lwów, which soon came under Soviet occupation. She was arrested by the NKVD in 1940 and sent to the gulag in Kazakhstan.

She was released as a result of the Sikorski-Mayski Agreement signed between the Soviet Union and the Polish government-in-exile, and volunteered for the Anders Army in the East. Along with the army she left the Soviet Union in 1942. She served in the Media and Propaganda department and the Women's Auxiliary Service. With the rank of corporal and later that of captain, she was present at all the battles of the Anders army. Herminia Naglerowa was the editor of the army's newspapers.

After the end of the war she did not return to then communist Poland but settled in Great Britain. She was the vice president of the Organization of Polish Writers Abroad. She wrote several novels based on her own experiences, Ludzie sponiewierani (1945, "Oppressed People"), Kazachstańskie noce (1958, "Kazakh Nights"), and "Sprawa Józefa Mosta" (1953, "The Case of Józef Most"). "Wspomnienia o pisarzach" (1960, "Memories of writers") and Wierność życiu (1967, "True to Life") were published posthumously.

In 1959, the Organization of Polish Writers Abroad endowed a prize in her name.

Her grave is located in the North Sheen Cemetery.

Works
Krauzowie i inni, Nakł. Oddziału Kultury i Prasy 2. Korpusu A.P., 1946
Sprawa Jósefa Mosta, Gryf Publishers, 1953
Loves and ambitions, Roy Publishers, 1954
Mickiewicz żywy, 1955
Wyspiański żywy, 1957
Wierność życiu, Nakł. Polskiej Fundacji Kulturalnej, 1967
Kazachstańskie noce, London, Biblioteka Polska Ośrodka Wydawniczego "Veritas", 1958

See also
Beata Obertyńska

References

1890 births
1957 deaths
Polish women writers
Polish deportees to Soviet Union
Polish people detained by the NKVD
Foreign Gulag detainees
Burials at North Sheen Cemetery